WLTN-FM is a full service adult contemporary formatted radio station in New Hampshire licensed to Lisbon, serving northern New Hampshire and the Northeast Kingdom of Vermont. WLTN-FM is owned by Barry P. Lunderville.

WLTN-FM went on the air August 19, 1991, as a Class A radio station broadcasting from Lisbon and with studios in Littleton. On air it was known as "Gold 96-7" and it was a locally-operated oldies radio station. In 1994, the services of Westwood One's Oldies Channel were instituted. In July 1999 ownership changed to Sharp Broadcasting and the format changed on September 12 of that year to its current Adult Contemporary format, switching satellite networks to Westwood's Bright AC and became known on air as Bright 96.7. When the station was sold to Lunderville, it became known as Mix 96.7. The station currently carries CBS News Radio. Sister station WLTN AM originally went on the air in 1963.

References

External links

LTN-FM
Mainstream adult contemporary radio stations in the United States
Radio stations established in 1991
1991 establishments in New Hampshire